Bezengi Wall, Pitsrula (also known as the Khalde Wall) is a  long mountain range of the Greater Caucasus, in the Svaneti region of Georgia and Kabardino-Balkaria region of Russia.

Highest section of the Central Caucasus. Notable peaks include Janga, Katyn-Tau, Shota Rustaveli Peak, Gistola, Lalveri and Esenin Peak. Bezengi Wall surrounded by ice cliffs on either side.

The geologic makeup of the mountains consists of grey granitoids. Bezengi Glacier lies on the northern slopes of the range and the Khalde Glacier and Shkhara Glacier located on the southern slopes. Avalanches occur each year.

Geography 
The Bezengi group is a group of some of the highest mountains of the Caucasus in the central Caucasus mountains. They form two large steep walls on the Russian side of the border, the Dychtau-Koshtantau ridge (Entirely in Russia) and the Bezengi wall on the border between Georgia and Russia, however the Bezengi wall is on the Russian side.

Climbing history 
Although many people had climbed most of the mountains along the ridge, they were the first to cover all of it and the first to cover large stretches of it. They finished their journey at the Zanner Pass.

References 

Mountain ranges of Georgia (country)
Mountain ranges of Russia